The women's 3000 metres event at the 2016 IAAF World U20 Championships was held at Zdzisław Krzyszkowiak Stadium on 20 July.

Medalists

Records

Results

References

3000 metres
Long distance running at the World Athletics U20 Championships